The St. Ursula's Church is a religious building belonging to the Catholic Church and is located in the Catholic presbytery of the village of The Valley on the island of Virgin Gorda of the British Virgin Islands, a dependent territory of the United Kingdom in the Caribbean Sea or of the Antilles.

As its name implies was dedicated to St. Ursula, follows the Roman or Latin rite and depends on the diocese of Saint John's-Basseterre. It stands out as having a prime location because it was built on a hill on the road to the tourist attraction of The Baths of the marina.

The congregation completed construction of his church in 1989. The parish supports various local activities such as religious education, youth ministry, music ministry and Catholic Community Center.

See also
Roman Catholic Diocese of Saint John's – Basseterre
Holy Family Cathedral (St. John's)

References

Roman Catholic churches in the British Virgin Islands
Roman Catholic churches completed in 1989
Virgin Gorda
20th-century Roman Catholic church buildings in the United Kingdom